Ilyinovka is a rural locality (a village) in Dedovsky Selsoviet, Fyodorovsky District, Bashkortostan, Russia. The population was 15 as of 2010.

Geography 
It is located 10 km from Fyodorovka, 3 km from Dedovo.

References 

Rural localities in Fyodorovsky District